Protein BAT4 is a protein that in humans is encoded by the BAT4 gene.

A cluster of genes, BAT1-BAT5, has been localized in the vicinity of the genes for TNF alpha and TNF beta. These genes are all within the human major histocompatibility complex class III region. The protein encoded by this gene is thought to be involved in some aspects of immunity.

References

External links

Further reading